The Bitch is the seventh novel by the British author Jackie Collins, first published in 1979.

The book is a sequel to her 1969 novel The Stud, and both novels were adapted into films in the late 1970s starring Collins' sister Joan Collins.

Plot
Ladies man Nico Constantine comes to Las Vegas to make a killing at the casinos but ends up owing the mob, big time.  Nico then meets the beautiful and wealthy Fontaine Khaled and sees her as a potential mark.

References

1979 British novels
English novels
British erotic novels
Novels by Jackie Collins
British novels adapted into films
W. H. Allen & Co. books